This is a list of electoral results for the Division of Higinbotham in Australian federal elections from the division's creation in 1949 until its abolition in 1969.

Members

Election results

Elections in the 1960s

1966

1963

1961

1960 by-election

Elections in the 1950s

1958

1955

1954

1951

Elections in the 1940s

1949

References

 Australian Electoral Commission. Federal election results

Australian federal electoral results by division